Snettisham is a village and civil parish in the English county of Norfolk.

The village's name means 'Snaet's/Sneti's homestead/village'.

For the purposes of local government, the parish falls within the district of King's Lynn and West Norfolk. The Civil Parish population had increased to 2,570 at the 2011 Census.

It consists of bird lagoons and bird observation hides, including a rotary hide. 

The Snettisham coast around the reserve is often said to be "where Norfolk stares at Lincolnshire". The River Ingol runs to the south of the village upon which stands the now unused Snettisham watermill. This is now in the process of being renovated (October 2011).

Though traces of the railway station and railway line can still be seen the service which was opened in 1862 was terminated in 1969.

Nikolaus Pevsner called it "perhaps the most exciting Decorated church in Norfolk". It served as the model for the later Christ Church Cathedral in Fredericton, New Brunswick, Canada, built 1845–1853.

The Snettisham Hoard is a series of discoveries of Iron Age precious metal, including nearly 180 gold torcs, 75 complete and the rest fragmentary, found in the area between 1948 and 1973 at Wild Ken Hill. In 1985 there was also a find of Romano-British jewellery and raw materials buried in a clay pot in AD 155, the Snettisham Jeweller's Hoard. Although this latter find has no direct connection with the nearby Iron Age finds, it may be evidence of a long tradition of gold- and silver-working in the area.

Snettisham has a complex entry in the Domesday Book of 1086, where it is divided in ownership between William de Warenne and the Bishop of Bayeux. Related berewicks are West Newton and Castle Rising, moreover Weston Longville is said to be in Snettisham's valuation. The name of the manor is spelt in four different ways, two very similar to the present pronunciation, one of Snesham and one of Nestesham.

Governance
An electoral ward in the same name exists. This ward had a population of 4,032 at the 2011 Census.

See also
Carrstone

Notes

External links

Information from Genuki Norfolk on Snettisham.
Current events link to Lynn News
 http://kepn.nottingham.ac.uk/map/place/Norfolk/Snettisham

Villages in Norfolk
King's Lynn and West Norfolk
Populated coastal places in Norfolk
Civil parishes in Norfolk
Beaches of Norfolk